Sharps Creek site or Swenson site  (14MP301) is an historic site in Lindsborg, Kansas. 

A magnetic gradiometer survey of the site has been conducted. The site was occupied from circa 1500 to 1800. In 1915 a professor at nearby Bethany College found Spanish chain mail at the site, which led to the naming of nearby Coronado Heights, a large hill few miles northeast of the site The site was added to the National Register of Historic Places in 1972.

See also
 Sharps Creek

References

External links
Sharps Creek Council Circle–Archaeo-Physics LLC

Archaeological sites on the National Register of Historic Places in Kansas
Geography of McPherson County, Kansas
National Register of Historic Places in McPherson County, Kansas
Plains Village period
Colonial United States (Spanish)
Pre-statehood history of Kansas